Amiri-ye Olya (also Romanized as Amīrī-ye ‘Olyā and Amīrī ‘Olyā; also known as Amīrī-ye Bālā and Amīrī Bālā) is a village in Rig Rural District, in the Central District of Lordegan County, Chaharmahal and Bakhtiari Province, Iran. At the 2006 census, its population was 146, in 24 families.

References 

Populated places in Lordegan County